Panda Entertainment, full name Panda Entertainment Technology Co., Ltd., was a video game developer from Taiwan that was active during the 1990s. They developed games for MS-DOS and for the Taiwanese only game console Super A'Can, made by Funtech. Their most famous game is Sango Fighter, and their highest selling game was Crazy Dodgeball. Some of their games became notorious for the usage of Adolf Hitler as a playable character, including the African Adventures series and Hilarious Bowling.
In 2009 North American company Super Fighter Team acquired the full legal rights to some of the company's games, re-releasing Sango Fighter as freeware immediately afterward. In 2012, Super Fighter Team acquired the remainder of Panda's games.

Games

Note: The title Gambling Lord was co-developed with Funtech.

Controversy around Sango Fighter 
Sango Fighter was developed based on the engine of Super Fighter, a game by Taiwanese developer C&E. The engine was taken without permission by a developer who left C&E and joined Panda. Because of the illegal engine, C&E sued Panda and won, forcing Panda to halt sales of Sango Fighter in Taiwan. However, the ruling did not stop a dozen pirate companies from continuing selling copies of the game. The game was released in English because another company translated it to English and sold it to a shareware company without permission. Shareware developer and publisher Apogee Software was planning on licensing and releasing the game in the United States under the title Violent Vengeance, but the plans for the deal fell through. A company called Accend pirated Sango Fighter and sold it in the USA without official permission from Panda Entertainment.

References

External links
 熊貓軟體全14: Panda Entertainment on Gamebase.com.tw.

Defunct video game companies of Taiwan